Sindundoyechon Station is a railway station on Gyeonggang Line of the Seoul Metropolitan Subway in Sindun-myeon, Icheon, Gyeonggi, South Korea.

Station Layout

External links

Metro stations in Icheon
Seoul Metropolitan Subway stations
Railway stations opened in 2016
Gyeonggang Line
Korail stations